Rome is an unincorporated community in Sumner County, Kansas, United States.  It is located about 6.5 miles south of Wellington at about 0.5 miles east of the intersection of U.S. Route 81 and E 90th St, next to the railroad.

History
A post office was opened in Rome in 1874, and remained in operation until it was discontinued in 1933.

Economy
Rome has a Farmers Co-Op Grain business with the capability to load grain into rail cars.

Education
The community is served by Wellington USD 353 public school district.

References

Further reading

External links
 Sumner County map, KDOT

Unincorporated communities in Sumner County, Kansas
Unincorporated communities in Kansas